Philip Lindau (born 18 August 1991 in Jönköping) is a Swedish former road cyclist.

Major results
2011
 1st  Road race, National Road Championships

References

External links

1991 births
Living people
Swedish male cyclists
Sportspeople from Jönköping